Campylocheta eudryae is a species in the family Tachinidae ("bristle flies"), in the order Diptera ("flies").

Distribution
Canada, United States

References

Diptera of North America
Dexiinae
Insects described in 1916